Amrutham is a 2004 Malayalam Family Drama directed by Sibi Malayil. Starring Jayaram, Arun, Padmapriya, and Bhavana in the lead roles. The film also stars Nedumudi Venu, Jagathy Sreekumar and KPAC Lalitha.

Plot
The story of "Amrutham" is about two brothers, Gopi and Dinesh. Gopi is a farmer who works hard to give his brother a good education after their father  deserts them when Dinesh is just a child.

Dinesh, now a final-year degree student, is involved with the daughter of the local teashop-owner played by Bhavana. Dinesh is also involved in college politics. On the other hand, Gopi is involved with a Muslim girl Sainaba. All hell breaks loose when Gopi marries Sainaba and brings her home.

Cast
 Jayaram as Gopinathan Nair
 Arun as Dineshan Nair
 Padmapriya as Sainaba
 Bhavana as Mridula
 Nedumudi Venu as Ravunni Nair 
 KPAC Lalitha as Sarojini
 Mamukkoya as Aimoottikka
 TG Ravi as Divakaran
 Vishnu Unnikrishnan
 Sreekala as Thaha
 Sudhi Joshi as Ashraf

Soundtrack
Amrutham's songs and background score were composed by M Jayachandran. The lyrics were written by Kaithapram Damodaran Namboothiri. The music album has 5 songs:

See also
 Amrita

External links
 

2004 films
2000s Malayalam-language films
Films scored by M. Jayachandran